The 2020 Notre Dame Fighting Irish women's soccer team represented the University of Notre Dame during the 2020 NCAA Division I women's soccer season. It was the 33rd season of the university fielding a program. The Fighting Irish were led by 3rd year head coach Nate Norman and played their games at Alumni Stadium.

Due to the COVID-19 pandemic, the ACC played a reduced schedule in 2020 and the NCAA Tournament was postponed to 2021.  The ACC did not play a spring league schedule, but did allow teams to play non-conference games that would count toward their 2020 record in the lead up to the NCAA Tournament.

The Fighting Irish finished the fall season 4–5–0, 4–4–0 in ACC play to finish in a tie for sixth place.  They were awarded the eighth seed in the ACC Tournament based on tiebreakers.  In the tournament they lost to Florida State in the Quarterfinals.  They finished the spring season 2–2–0 and were not invited to the NCAA Tournament.

Previous season 

The Fighting Irish finished the season 11–8–2, 4–4–2 in ACC play to finish in a tie for eighth place.  As the eight seed in the ACC Tournament, they lost to North Carolina in the Quarterfinals.  They received an at-large bid to the NCAA Tournament where they defeated Saint Louis in the first round, before losing to South Carolina in the Second Round.

Squad

Roster

Updated February 12, 2021

Team management

Source:

Schedule
Source 

|-
!colspan=6 style=""| Fall Regular Season

|-
!colspan=6 style=";"| ACC Tournament

|-
!colspan=6 style=""| Exhibition

|-
!colspan=6 style=""| Spring Regular Season

Rankings

Fall 2020

Spring 2021

References

Notre Dame
Notre Dame Fighting Irish women's soccer seasons
2020 in sports in Indiana